The Salvation Army U.S.A. Western Territory is an administrative unit of The Salvation Army that serves the thirteen Western United States, the Marshall Islands, the Federated States of Micronesia and Guam.  The territory is one of four Salvation Army Territories within the United States of America.  The Western Territorial Headquarters is located in Rancho Palos Verdes, California, and is currently under the leadership of Commissioner Douglas Riley.  The territory is divided geographically into nine divisions, each headed by a divisional commander.

In addition to mobile programs such as disaster relief, and homeless soup lines, the Salvation Army U.S.A. Western Territory currently operates hundreds of permanent facilities including 307 Corps community centers, 31 Adult Rehabilitation Centers, 13 summer camps, 36 Silvercrest Residences, and 6 adult day care centers.  The territory runs its own accredited, two-year college in Rancho Palos Verdes, CA. The Salvation Army College for Officer Training is dedicated to the education of those individuals who desire to become full-time leaders or officers in the Army's ranks. The Salvation Army Museum of the West  is a Salvation Army history museum and archive, operated by the territory.  The territory also publishes a weekly newspaper, The New Frontier, and a quarterly social-services magazine, Caring.

Origins

The roots of the Western Territory date back to the summer of 1882.  At this time there was no Salvation Army presence in the Western United States, the movement only having reached the United States two years earlier on March 10, 1880. However, a group of Bay Area "holiness men," having been impressed by a copy of the Army's London based War Cry magazine, decided by unanimous vote that they would change their name from the Pacific Holiness Association to The Salvation Army.  They then chose George Newton as their "Commander," and held their first meeting later that year on October 6, 1882.

Over the course of the next year the group held services, formed a small brass band, and even published five issues of their own War Cry magazine, all the while petitioning the Salvation Army's founder and international leader William Booth to send them a real Salvation Army officer.  Booth eventually agreed, and in 1883 Major Alfred Wells, and Major Henry Stillwell were sent to begin the Army's work in San Francisco.  Major Wells opened the Army's first building in the West, San Francisco Citadel #1, on July 21, 1883.

Originally, the Western United States was classified as the Pacific Coast Division, but in 1921 was given territorial status.  The West's first territorial commander was Lt. Commissioner Adam Gifford.

Western Territorial Commanders

1920 -- Lt. Commissioner Adam Gifford
1932 -- Lt. Commissioner Benjamine Orames
1940 -- Lt. Commissioner Donald McMillan
1944 -- Lt. Commissioner William Barrett
1948 -- Lt. Commissioner Claude Bates
1952 -- Lt. Commissioner Claude Bates
1953 -- Lt. Commissioner Holland French
1957 -- Lt. Commissioner Samuel Hepburn
1961 -- Commissioner Samuel Hepburn
1962 -- Lt. Commissioner Glen Ryan
1966 -- Lt. Commissioner William J. Parkins
1971 -- Commissioner Paul S. Kaiser
1974 -- Commissioner Richard E. Holz
1980 -- Commissioner Lawrence R. Smith
1982 -- Commissioner William Pratt
1984 -- Commissioner Willard S. Evans
1989 -- Commissioner Paul A. Rader
1994 -- Commissioner Peter H. Chang
1997 -- Commissioner David Edwards
2002 -- Commissioner Linda Bond
2004 Interim -- Commissioner Bill Luttrell
2005 -- Commissioner Philip Swyers
2010 -- Commissioner James Knaggs
2017 -- Commissioner Kenneth G. Hodder

Divisions of the Western Territory

Alaska Division
California South*
Cascade Division
Del Oro Division
Golden State Division
Hawaiian and Pacific Islands Division
Intermountain Division
Northwest Division
Southwest Division

formerly: Sierra Del Mar Division and Southern California Division

See also
Chief of the Staff of The Salvation Army
Generals of The Salvation Army
High Council of The Salvation Army
Officer (The Salvation Army)
Soldier (The Salvation Army)
The Salvation Army
The Salvation Army U.S.A Central Territory

Sources

External links
The Salvation Army USA Western Territory Website
The Salvation Army USA Southern California Divisional Website
The Salvation Army
The Salvation Army Community
SAGALA - Salvation Army Guards and Legions Association
Salvation Army Museum Basel, Switzerland
Salvation Army International Heritage Centre

Salvation Army U.S.A. Western Territory
Salvation Army U.S.A. Western Territory
Salvation Army U.S.A. Western Territory
Christian organizations established in 1921
1921 establishments in the United States
Salvationism in the United States